Marianne Flotron is a former Swiss curler.

She is a former European champion.

She started curling in 1979.

Teams

References

External links
 

Swiss female curlers
European curling champions
Swiss curling champions